Stilt is a common name for several species of birds in the family Recurvirostridae, which also includes those known as avocets. They are found in brackish or saline wetlands in warm or hot climates.

They have extremely long legs, hence the group name, and long thin bills. Stilts typically feed on aquatic insects and other small creatures and nest on the ground surface in loose colonies.

Most sources recognize 6 species in 2 genera, although the white-backed and Hawaiian stilts are occasionally considered subspecies of the black-necked stilt.

The genus Charadrius was introduced by the French zoologist Mathurin Jacques Brisson in 1760 with the black-winged stilt (Himantopus himantopus) as the type species. The generic name Himantopus comes from the Ancient Greek meaning "strap-leg".

Species 

The genus Himantopus contains five species:
 Black-winged stilt, Himantopus himantopus
 White-backed stilt, Himantopus melanurus
 Pied stilt, Himantopus leucocephalus
 Black-necked stilt, Himantopus mexicanus
 Hawaiian stilt or aeʻo, Himantopus mexicanus knudseni
 Black stilt, Himantopus novaezelandiae

The genus Cladorhynchus is monotypic and contains a single species:
 Banded stilt, Cladorhynchus leucocephalus

A fossil stilt has been described by Bickart, 1990, as Himantopus olsoni, based on remains recovered in the Late Miocene Big Sandy Formation of Mohave County, Arizona, United States.

References

Bird common names
Recurvirostridae